67 Windmill Street, Millers Point is a heritage-listed shop with residence located at 67 Windmill Street, in the inner city Sydney suburb of Millers Point in the City of Sydney local government area of New South Wales, Australia. The property was added to the New South Wales State Heritage Register on 2 April 1999.

History 
Millers Point is one of the earliest areas of European settlement in Australia, and a focus for maritime activities. This shop was built  and over time has had a number of uses.

Description 
Two-storey stone 1840s shop/residence of simple composition and detailing. Two sash windows on upper level, dormer window to attic. Storeys: Two; Construction: Painted stone walls, corrugated galvanised iron, painted timber joinery. Style: Georgian.

The external condition of the property is good.

Modifications and dates 
External: Parapet capping repaired badly. Some joinery mortified.

Heritage listing 
As at 23 November 2000, 67 Windmill Street, Millers Point, an early nineteenth century shop, is representative of early commercial activity in the area, and is an important streetscape element.

It is part of the Millers Point Conservation Area, an intact residential and maritime precinct. It contains residential buildings and civic spaces dating from the 1830s and is an important example of 19th century adaptation of the landscape.

67 Windmill Street, Millers Point was listed on the New South Wales State Heritage Register on 2 April 1999.

See also 

Australian non-residential architectural styles
65 Windmill Street
69 Windmill Street

References

Bibliography

Attribution

External links

 

New South Wales State Heritage Register sites located in Millers Point
Victorian architecture in Sydney
Houses in Millers Point, New South Wales
Retail buildings in New South Wales
Articles incorporating text from the New South Wales State Heritage Register
Georgian Revival architecture in Australia
1840 establishments in Australia
Houses completed in 1840
Millers Point Conservation Area